Dendrodoris krebsii is a species of sea slug, a dorid nudibranch, a marine gastropod mollusc in the family Dendrodorididae.

Taxonomy
It was previously considered a subspecies of Doriopsilla areolata Bergh, 1880 by Valdés & Ortea (1997), but Valdés & Hamann (2008) confirmed that it is a distinct species.

Distribution 
Distribution of Doriopsilla nigrolineata includes Panama and Honduras.

Description 
The shape of the body is oval to elongate. Dorsum is rigid and covered with rounded tubercles. Background color is translucent white to orange, with a series of irregular black lines over the entire dorsum. Bases of tubercles are densely spotted with white. Rhinophores and gill are yellow. The maximum recorded body length is 30 mm.

Ecology
Minimum recorded depth is 3 m. Maximum recorded depth is 12 m. It was found in the depth of 3–6 m of water in Panama.

References
This article incorporates Creative Commons (CC-BY-4.0) text from the reference

External links 

Dendrodorididae
Gastropods described in 1977